Air France Hop, formerly branded HOP!, is a French regional airline operating flights on behalf of its parent company Air France. The airline was founded on 21 December 2012 after the merger of Airlinair, Brit Air and Régional brands. Its head office is at Nantes Atlantique Airport.

History

The new airline brand was created to better compete with the low-cost airlines which have taken a significant market share of Air France's regional routes. Régional operated with 44 aircraft to 38 destinations; Brit Air had 39 aircraft and served 32 destinations; and Airlinair served 26 destinations with its 24 aircraft; a combined total of 107 aircraft.

In July 2015, Air France–KLM announced the formalization of its merger for 2017 of the Brit Air, Régional and Airlinair brands under the Hop! Brand, after having already legally grouped its structures under the eponymous company, thereby reducing its costs.

In October 2018, it was reported that HOP! will face restructuring measures, including the merger of all operations under the AF flight codes of parent Air France and a revision of the operated aircraft types.

In February 2019, Air France announced that HOP! services will be rebranded as "Air France Hop". The first aircraft received the revised livery - being the one of Air France with small HOP! titles added - in May 2019.

On 1 September 2019, all HOP! flights moved to operate under the Air France brand and flight code. All aircraft will be gradually repainted into the Air France livery. In December 2020, it was announced that HOP! would be restructured as a smaller feeder carrier. This new plan would see HOP! disappearing as a separate brand from Air France, transferring its Paris-Orly hub to Transavia France, and retiring its Bombardier CRJ fleet.

Destinations

Codeshare agreements
Air France Hop has codeshare agreements with the following airlines:

Air Corsica
Air France

Fleet

Current fleet

As of December 2022, the Air France Hop fleet consists of the following aircraft:

Former fleet

Air France Hop previously operated the following aircraft:

See also
List of airlines of France

References

External links

Airlines of France
Airlines established in 2012
Air France–KLM
SkyTeam affiliate members
Val-de-Marne
Companies based in Pays de la Loire
French companies established in 2012